Game Over: How Nintendo Zapped an American Industry, Captured Your Dollars, and Enslaved Your Children is a non-fiction book written by David Sheff and published by Random House, New York in 1993. Based on many extensive interviews of high level historical figures, it has provided a research foundation for subsequent works, with a positive critical reception.

Overview 
The book details the modern history of Nintendo and its rise to become the most powerful electronic gaming company in the world as of 1993. It provides a history of the worldwide electronic gaming industry as a whole from the 1960s to the 1990s.

Beyond its very specific title, the book is fairly neutral; it mainly relates the history of the company to the positives and negatives of its business practices. Sheff attributes many of Nintendo's successes to what reviewer James Fallows termed "the Japanese system's tolerance for monopoly". Sheff defends the accuracy of the "enslaved your children" portion of the subtitle, stating that "kids will play the games compulsively and non-stop".

The book provides a foundation for subsequent historical research because the author extensively interviewed numerous historical industry figures, such as Howard Lincoln, Nolan Bushnell, Shigeru Miyamoto (misspelled as "Sigeru" if regarding Hepburn romanization as definitive), Alexey Pajitnov, and anonymous sources.

Revisions
Game Over: How Nintendo Conquered the World, an edition published by Vintage Press in 1994, contains a new foreword written by author David Sheff pertaining to the controversy over video game content in the early 1990s. In 1999, a revised edition of the book titled Game Over: Press Start to Continue – The Maturing of Mario (referencing Nintendo's flagship character Mario) was released. It has error corrections, and photographs and new chapters written by Andy Eddy. An edited version was printed by Coronet Books and given away free with the May 1999 issue of Arcade magazine.

Reception
The book had a mostly positive reception. Christopher Lehmann–Haupt of The New York Times wrote that the book is "irresistible ... Game Over tells a remarkable series of stories ... And maybe that is its hidden message. Maybe that is what makes it, at its best, almost as hypnotic as a successful video game." Alex Kozinsky of The Wall Street Journal called it "the bible of the videogame industry" and "ultimately less absorbing than Tetris, but not by much". Clarence Petersen of the Chicago Tribune called it "a cross between Barbarians at the Gate and The Soul of a New Machine". People magazine said, "Writing with the playful pluck of Mario [...] Sheff unfolds an engrossing tale." Fellow technology historian Steven Levy said, "Mr. Sheff is comprehensive and instructive. ... Whoever those future billionaires are, they would do well to read this book." Alan Deutschman of Fortune said, "Finally, a book as provocative as its title, Game Over is a detailed, fascinating, and instructive case study". Deirdre McMurdy of Maclean's said, "Sheff painstakingly documents the history of Nintendo and its relentless rise to dominance of the global toy industry." Next Generation gave a positive review for the breadth, quality of research, and easy readability. It remarked that the one flaw is that the frequent detours from the Nintendo story give the reader the feeling that the book is an overview of gaming history in general with an unbalanced focus on Nintendo. It concluded, "Next Generation uses Game Over as a reference guide on a day-to-day basis, and we really can't give any higher recommendation than that."

Legacy
The high level of interview access to major historical figures, which US Gamer described as "unprecedented" and making it "the definitive work", has been referenced by nearly all other subsequent books and articles about Nintendo's history.

References

Further reading
 

1993 non-fiction books
1993 in video gaming
Books about computer and internet entrepreneurs
History books about video games
Random House books
Works about Nintendo